South Branch West Canada Creek empties into the West Canada Creek by Nobleboro, New York .

Course
The West Canada Creek's south branch gets its start at T-lake, northwest of Piseco Lake.  It travels southwest, through the town of Morehouse, and joins the main branch of the West Canada at Nobleboro.  North of Route 8 on Mountain Home Road is a man-made lake called The Floe on the maps, but to the locals it is called Mountain Home Pond.

References

Rivers of New York (state)
Rivers of Hamilton County, New York
Rivers of Herkimer County, New York